Richard Phelps (born 21 November 1965) is a British former rower. He competed in the men's eight event at the 1992 Summer Olympics.

References

External links
 

1965 births
Living people
British male rowers
Olympic rowers of Great Britain
Rowers at the 1992 Summer Olympics
Rowers from Greater London
Stewards of Henley Royal Regatta